Interstate 94 (I-94) is an east–west Interstate Highway, which links Billings, Montana, to the Canada–US border in Port Huron, Michigan.

Route description

Yellowstone County 
I-94 starts in Yellowstone County in Billings at I-90 and travels northeast to the towns of Huntley, Ballantine, Pompeys Pillar, and Custer.

Treasure, Rosebud, and Custer counties 
Entering Treasure County, I-94 passes near the small towns of Bighorn and Hysham; there is a little ranch access at milemarker 63.01. There are two intersections of US Highway 12 (US 12) and Montana Highway 59 (MT 59) before entering Forsyth, after that is Custer County which is the east end of US 12 after crossing the city of Miles City.

Prairie, Dawson, and Wibaux counties 
After entering Prairie County after passing the small towns of Terry and Fallon, the next county is Dawson County, entering the cities of Glendive which connects with MT 16 and entering the city of Wibaux before entering the North Dakota state line.

History

Exit list

References

 Montana
94
Transportation in Yellowstone County, Montana
Transportation in Treasure County, Montana
Transportation in Rosebud County, Montana
Transportation in Custer County, Montana
Transportation in Prairie County, Montana
Transportation in Dawson County, Montana
Transportation in Wibaux County, Montana